The 1999–2000 Coca-Cola Champions Trophy was a triangular ODI cricket competition held in Sharjah, United Arab Emirates from 13 to 22 October 1999. It featured the national cricket teams of Pakistan, Sri Lanka and West Indies. Its official sponsor was Coca-Cola. The tournament was won by Pakistan, who defeated Sri Lanka in the final.

Squads

Points table

Group stage

1st ODI

2nd ODI

3rd ODI

4th ODI

5th ODI

6th ODI

Final

References

1999 in West Indian cricket
Cricket in the United Arab Emirates
1999 in Sri Lankan cricket
1999 in Pakistani cricket
One Day International cricket competitions
International cricket competitions from 1997–98 to 2000
1999 in Emirati cricket
October 1999 sports events in Asia